Juan Luis Sainfleur Hernández (born February 17, 1982) is a sprinter from the Dominican Republic specializing in the 100 metres.

He won a bronze medal at the 2004 Ibero-American Championships. Participating in the 2004 Summer Olympics, he failed to finish in his 100 metre heat, thus failing to make it through to the second round. He also participated at the 2005 World Championships, exiting in the quarter finals.

He finished fifth at the 2006 Central American and Caribbean Games.

His personal best time is 10.22 seconds, achieved in May 2004 in Santo Domingo.

Achievements

References

1982 births
Living people
Dominican Republic male sprinters
Athletes (track and field) at the 2004 Summer Olympics
Olympic athletes of the Dominican Republic
Central American and Caribbean Games gold medalists for the Dominican Republic
Competitors at the 2002 Central American and Caribbean Games
Central American and Caribbean Games medalists in athletics